St Rita's College is an independent Roman Catholic single-sex secondary day school for girls, located in Clayfield, Brisbane, Queensland, Australia.

The school was founded in 1926 and follows in the tradition of the Presentation Sisters, founded by Nano Nagle, and currently educates approximately 1000 girls from grades 5–12. St Rita's is a member of the Catholic Secondary Schoolgirls' Sports Association.

The school's motto is Latin, Virtute Non Verbis, which translates to English as Actions Not Words.

History
St Rita's College was founded by two Presentation Sisters, Sister Alice Kennedy and Sister Mary Madden, and was established as a kindergarten through to senior school on 27 September 1926. The initial enrolment consisted of 16 students with kindergarten - grade 3 being co-educational and grade 4 - senior girls only. Boarders were accepted from all grades.

By 1960 the primary school grades of St Rita's had been transferred to St Agatha's Primary School on the adjacent site. By 1970 St Rita's College no longer offered a boarding facility to its students.

School buildings
 Nano Nagle Centre: Completed in 2011, the Nagle Centre houses the College's Information Technology network and support centre, main reception, eight modern teaching rooms, a large function room with panoramic views across the bay and northern suburbs, as well as the two-level Resource Centre. The Resource Centre has been designed to cater for whole class, small group and individual working modes and connects to three other buildings, allowing easy access.
 Acqua Rosa Centre: In 2003, the Acqua Rosa Centre was completed – a 25 m x 25 m x 2 m heated pool. Not only is this building state of the art, but it is also aesthetically pleasing. The foyer houses the stained glass windows depicting St Rita's life as well as the structured glass windows that depict the logo and emblem of each House. The pool itself is inlaid with a stained glass rose. In the beautiful landscaped gardens rests one of the blocks from the old pool.
 Eirene Centre: Construction of the Eirene Centre with its multi-purpose hall, Art classrooms, additional multi-purpose classrooms, Gym and function room was completed in 2000. This building also housed a 120,000 litre tank to store storm water from the extensive roof. This water is being used to irrigate the grounds. 
 Kennedy Centre: Built in 1938, the Kennedy centre is named after one of the founding sisters of the school and the school's first principal, Sr Alice Kennedy, the centre formerly contained multi-purpose classrooms but more recently was renovated to hold staff offices as well as the new school Pantry. 
 Sr Elvera Sesta Science Centre: Constructed during the 1970s, the science centre was originally named after Nano Nagle, and housed 4 science laboratories. In 2011, coinciding with the construction of the new Nano Nagle Centre, the science building had an additional 2 laboratories added to the top floor and was renamed after former Principal, Sr Elvera Sesta PBVM, herself a science graduate of the University of Queensland.
 Presentation Centre: Built in 1995, the Presentation Centre houses the school's Digital Innovations, Business and Design classrooms as well as the Hospitality Rooms. The Centre was formerly home to the College Pantry. 
 Sacred Heart Centre: Built in 1964, the Sacred Heart centre contains the school's student reception as well as 10 multi-purpose classrooms and a state of the art Physics laboratory.
 Stanley Hall: Built in the late 1880s, and originally the only building on the school's grounds, it was once used to accommodate the 14 sisters that lived at the school in the Presentation Convent. During 2009 the school's sisters chose to move to a more convenient residence, handing stewardship of the heritage listed building to the College management. In 2013 the building was extensively renovated as the senior administration and teaching staff hub.
 Trinity Centre: 
Originally constructed in the early 1980’s but more recently rebuilt in 2020. The now 5 storey building houses the college’s auditorium, music level, drama rooms, Film and TV Green Room as well as 12 additional multi-purpose classrooms. The building gets its name from the Father, Son and Holy Spirit - The Holy Trinity.

Notable alumnae

Julieanne Alroe, CEO of Brisbane Airport, Chair of Infrastructure Australia
Eloise Amberger - Olympian, Synchronised Swimming
Abbie Chatfield - 2020 Bachelor Australia runner-up, social media celebrity
Sophie Conway - Australian Rules Footballer with Brisbane Lions
Kate McCarthy - sportsperson with Queensland Cricket and Brisbane Lions
Georgia Prestwidge - Brisbane Heat Cricket Team

References

External links 

Catholic secondary schools in Brisbane
Presentation Sisters schools
Girls' schools in Queensland
Educational institutions established in 1926
1926 establishments in Australia
Clayfield, Queensland
Alliance of Girls' Schools Australasia